Karma Rider ( literally "Master, Understood") is a 2013 Hong Kong ancient crime television drama produced by TVB, starring Raymond Wong and Priscilla Wong as the main leads with Matt Yeung, Evergreen Mak, Kaki Leung, Cilla Kung, Helena Law, Yoyo Chen, Cheung Kwok Keung, Benjamin Yuen, Matthew Ko, Rachel Kan and Kenny Wong in major supporting roles. It was broadcast between July and August of 2013.

Synopsis
Chor Yat Chin (Raymond Wong) was saved by a kind-hearted man when he was young and since then, his life ambition was to become the world’s best constable. His training and hard work paid off when he solved a mystery case on his first day of work. However, his superior, Ching Ying Hung (Mat Yeung), did not approve of Yat Chin's methods of solving the case, as he was a man who strictly kept to the rules, hence the two do not get along well in the Yamen. As another murder case arose, Yat Chin must enter Ma Heung Town's forbidden territory: Kau Lau Village. It is known among the town that criminals live in the village, and no constable or official, even the Emperor himself, can enter the place. However, Yat Chin encounters Foon Hei (Priscilla Wong), a pickpocket who saves him numerous times, and she helps him infiltrate the Village.

Along the way, Yat Chin also come across Wan Tin Bong (Evergreen Mak), an odd man who is linked to Yat Chin's past and is the core suspect of the murder case. With the murder case on his hands, Yat Chin begins to have dreams of himself as Liang Shanbo from the Butterfly Lovers legend. The dream indicates that he is the reincarnation of Liang Shanbo, but with the sudden appearance of the daughter of a wealthy merchant, Wu Deep (Yoyo Chen), Yat Chin is unable to tell who his predestined partner and the reincarnation of Zhu Yingtai is: Foon Hei, or Wu Deep?

Cast

The Scallion Household

Ma Heung Town Yamen

Chun Fa Bathhouse

East Kau Lau

Others

Viewership ratings

References

External links
 TVB.com Karma Rider - Official Website 

TVB dramas
2013 Hong Kong television series debuts
2013 Hong Kong television series endings
Period television series